Conakry (N’ko: ߞߐߣߊߞߙߌ߫, Fula: Konaakiri 𞤑𞤮𞤲𞤢𞥄𞤳𞤭𞤪𞤭) is the capital and largest city of Guinea. A port city, it serves as the economic, financial and cultural centre of Guinea. Its population as of the 2014 Guinea census was 1,660,973.

The current population of Conakry is difficult to ascertain, although the U.S. Department of State's Bureau of African Affairs has estimated it at two million, accounting for one-sixth of the entire population of the country.

History 

The city was essentially founded after Britain ceded the island to France in 1887. In 1885 the two island villages of Conakry and Boubinet had fewer than 500 inhabitants. Conakry became the capital of French Guinea in 1904 and prospered as an export port, particularly after a railway (now closed) to Kankan opened up the interior of the country for the large-scale export of groundnut.

In the decades after independence, the population of Conakry boomed, from 50,000 inhabitants in 1958 to 600,000 in 1980, to over two million today. Its small land area and relative isolation from the mainland, while an advantage to its colonial founders, has created an infrastructural burden since independence.

In 1970 conflict between Portuguese forces and the PAIGC in neighbouring Portuguese Guinea (now Guinea-Bissau) spilled into the Republic of Guinea when a group of 350 Portuguese troops and Guinean loyalists landed near Conakry, attacked the city and freed 26 Portuguese prisoners of war held by the PAIGC before retreating, having failed to overthrow the government or kill the PAIGC leadership.

Camp Boiro, a feared concentration camp during the rule of Sekou Toure, was located in Conakry.

According to human rights groups, 157 people died during the 2009 Guinea protest when the military junta opened fire against tens of thousands of protesters in the city on 28 September 2009.

Geography 

Originally situated on Tombo Island, one of the Îles de Los, it has since spread up the neighboring Kaloum Peninsula.

Climate 
According to Köppen climate classification, Conakry features a tropical monsoon climate (Köppen climate classification: Am). Conakry features a wet season and a dry season. Like most of West Africa, Conakry's dry season is dominated by the harmattan wind between December and April. As a result, almost no rain falls in the city during these months.

However, the dry season is still dry, with January and February only receiving  of rainfall on average. Sunshine is lower in the wet season than the dry season, with August receiving the least sunshine and March receiving the most.

Population

Year	Population	Growth Rate
2023	8,045,311,447	0.88%
2022	7,975,105,156	0.83%
2021	7,909,295,151	0.87%
|title=Conakry population statistics |access-date=1 March 2023

Government and administration 

Conakry is a special city with a single region and prefecture government. The local government of the city was decentralized in 1991 between five municipal communes headed by a mayor. From the tip in the southwest, these are:

 Kaloum – the city centre
 Dixinn – including the University of Conakry and many embassies
 Ratoma – known for its nightlife
 Matam
 Matoto – home to Conakry International Airport.

The five urban communes make up the Conakry Region, one of the eight Regions of Guinea, which is headed by a governor. At the second-tier prefecture level, the city is designated as the Conakry Special Zone, though the prefecture and regional government are one and the same. At an estimated two million inhabitants, it is far and away the largest city in Guinea, making up almost a quarter of the nation's population and making it more than four times bigger than its nearest rival, Kankan.

Economy 

Conakry is Guinea's largest city and its administrative, communications, and economic centre. The city's economy revolves largely around the port, which has modern facilities for handling and storing cargo, through which alumina and bananas are shipped. Manufactures include food products and cement, metal manufactures, and fuel products.

Markets 
 Marché Madina
 Marché du Niger

Infrastructure crisis 
Periodic power and water cuts have been a daily burden for Conakry's residents since early 2002. Government and power company officials blame the drought of February 2001 for a failure of the hydro-electric supply to the capital, and a failure of aging machinery for the continuation of the crisis. Critics of the government cite mismanagement, corruption and the withdrawal of the power agency's French partner at the beginning of 2002. , much of the city has no traffic lighting in the overnight hours.

Popular anger at shortages in Conakry was entwined with anti-government protests, strikes, and violence against the rule of President Lansana Conté and the successive prime ministers Cellou Dalein Diallo and Eugène Camara appointed to fill the post after the resignation of Prime Minister François Lonseny Fall in April 2004. Violence reached a peak in January–February 2007 in a general strike, which saw over one hundred deaths when the Army confronted protesters.

Transportation 
Conakry is serviced by Conakry International Airport which has flights to several cities in West Africa and Europe.

Architecture 
 
 Presidential Palace
 Palais du Peuple

Hospitals 
 Donka Hospital
 Ignace Deen Hospital
 Clinique Ambroise Paré
 Clinique Pasteur

Culture 

 Sandervalia National Museum
 National Library of Guinea and National Archives of Guinea
 Camp Boiro
 Monument du 22 Novembre 1970

Places of worship

Important Islamic mosques in the city include the Grand Mosque of Conakry. There are also Christian churches and temples, including the Roman Catholic Archdiocese of Conakry's Cathédrale Sainte-Marie, the Église Protestante Évangélique de Guinée (Alliance World Fellowship), and the Assemblies of God.

Universities and education
 Collège Gbessia Centre
 Collège-Lycée Sainte-Marie
 Gamal Abdel Nasser University (Institut Polytechnique de Conakry)
 Institut Géographique National (Guinea)
 Université Kofi Annan

Parks and gardens
 Jardin 2 Octobre
 Conakry Botanical Garden

Notable people 
 

Mamadi Diakite, NBA basketball player for the Cleveland Cavaliers
Maciré Sylla, singer, dancer, author and composer

See also 
 2007 Guinean general strike
 2009 Guinea protest
 Île Tamara Lighthouse

References 

 Dave, Nomi (2019) The Revolution's Echoes: Music, Politics & Pleasure in Guinea. Chicago: The University of Chicago Press.
 Thomas O'Toole, Janice E. Baker. (2005) Historical Dictionary of Guinea. Scarecrow Press. 
 Philipps, Joschka (2013) Ambivalent Rage: Youth Gangs and Urban Protest in Conakry, Guinea. Harmattan Guinée.
 Cohen, Adrienne ( 2019) "Performing Excess: Urban Ceremony and the Semiotics of Precarity in Guinea-Conakry." Africa: The Journal of the International African Institute. 89 (4): 718–738.
 Odile Goerg. "Chieftainships between Past and Present: From City to Suburb and Back in Colonial Conakry, 1890s–1950s". Africa Today, Summer 2006, Vol. 52, No. 4, Pages 2–27
 Conakry the Capital: history of the city at site of expat artist.
 HISTOIRE DE CONAKRY, 1463 to present, by Luc MOGENET, reprinted at guineeconakry.info (no date)
 Kids in Guinea Study Under Airport Lamps, RUKMINI CALLIMACHI The Associated Press, Thursday, 19 July 2007.
 Archdiocese of Conakry: history and structure (at catholic-hierarchy.org)
 Guinea's Telecommunication Infrastructure, United Nations Economic Commission for Africa (UNECA), 1999 figures.

Notes

External links 

 guineeconakry.info/: Conakry-based news portal
 Le Jour Guinée 
 Office National du Tourisme, République du Guinée.
 l'Université Kofi Annan de Guinée (UNIKAG)
 Satellite image of Conakry and the Kaloum Peninsula, from the European Space Agency's Envisat: image description at http://www.esa.int/esaEO/SEMAV21XDYD_index_1.html.
 Moussa Dadis Camara speaks to Radio France Internationale after Conakry massacre

 
Capitals in Africa
Populated coastal places in Guinea
Populated places in Guinea
Ports and harbours of Guinea
Prefectures of Guinea
Regional capitals in Guinea